Bassenthwaite Lake railway station was situated on the Cockermouth, Keswick and Penrith Railway between Penrith and Cockermouth in Cumbria, England. The station served the village of Dubwath.

The station opened to passenger traffic on 2 January 1865, and closed on 18 April 1966. A camping coach was positioned here by the London Midland Region in 1954 this was increased to three coaches in 1955 and then two coaches from 1956 to 1964.

The station building and one platform are still visible from the A66 through the trees although the station fell into a state of disrepair and lost its roof. The Station Master's house remains on the side of the A66 but the east bound platform and goods yards are now part of the road.

In 2019 a replica French-style steam locomotive with Wagons-Lits carriages used in the 2017 film of Murder on the Orient Express were installed on the site as part of a tourist development.

References

Further reading
 
 
 

Disused railway stations in Cumbria
Former Cockermouth, Keswick and Penrith Railway stations
Railway stations in Great Britain opened in 1865
Railway stations in Great Britain closed in 1966
Beeching closures in England